Ben Berden (born 29 September 1975 in Hasselt) is a Belgian professional racing cyclist specializing in cyclocross. Berden was caught for doping in January 2005, immediately admitted to it, and was ultimately banned from the sport for 15 months.

Career highlights

1993–1994
, World U19 Cyclo-Cross Championship, Koksijde
1995–1996
 U23 Cyclo-Cross Champion, Overijse
3rd, Leudelange, Cyclo-cross
1996–1997
2nd, National U23 Cyclo-Cross Championship, Hoogstraten
2nd, Paal-Beringen, Cyclo-cross
1997–1998
2nd, Koningshooikt, Cyclo-cross
3rd, Fond-de-Gras, Cyclo-cross
3rd, Paal-Beringen, Cyclo-cross
1998–1999
1st, Overall, Ronde van Vlaams-Brabant
 Winner Stage 1, Heverlee
1st, Bredene, Cyclo-cross
1st, Eernegem, Cyclo-cross
1st, Muhlenbach, Cyclo-cross
2nd, Duffel, Cyclo-cross
3rd, Ruiselede/Doomkerke, Cyclo-cross
3rd, Koppenberg, Cyclo-cross
3rd, Eeklo, Cyclo-cross
1999–2000
2nd, Ostend, Cyclo-cross
3rd, Koningshooikt, Cyclo-cross
3rd, Eeklo, Cyclo-cross
2000–2001
1st, Zelzate, Cyclo-cross
2001–2002
1st, Eernegem, Cyclo-cross
1st, Zürich-Waid, Cyclo-cross
2nd, Rijkevorsel, Cyclo-cross
2nd, Zonnebeke, Cyclo-cross
2nd, Wielsbeke, Cyclo-cross
2nd, Muhlenbach, Cyclo-cross
3rd, Ostend, Cyclo-cross
3rd, Wortegem-Petegem, Cyclo-cross
3rd, Baal, Cyclo-cross
3rd, Otegem, Cyclo-cross
2002–2003
1st, Châteaubernard, Cyclo-cross
1st, Koksijde, Cyclo-cross
1st, Lieshout, Cyclo-cross
1st, Heerlen, Cyclo-cross
1st, Oostmalle, Cyclo-cross
1st, Wortegem-Petegem, Cyclo-cross
1st, Magstadt, Cyclo-cross
2nd, Sint-Niklaas, Cyclo-cross
2nd, National Cyclo-Cross Championship, Wielsbeke
2nd, Pijnacker-Nootdorp, Cyclo-cross
3rd, Lanarvily, Cyclo-cross
3rd, Kalmthout, Cyclo-cross
3rd, Wortegem-Petegem, Cyclo-cross
3rd, Baal, Cyclo-cross
3rd, Wetzikon, Cyclo-cross
3rd, Eeklo, Cyclo-cross
3rd, Hoogerheide, Cyclo-cross
2003–2004
1st, Eernegem Cyclo-cross
1st, Huijbergen, Cyclo-cross
1st, Koksijde, Cyclo-cross
1st, Magstadt, Cyclo-cross
2nd, Zolder, Cyclo-cross
2nd, Erpe-Mere, Cyclo-cross
2nd, Woerden, Cyclo-cross
2nd, Hamme-Zogge, Cyclo-cross
2nd, Baal, Cyclo-cross
3rd, Middelkerke, Cyclo-cross
3rd, Dottignies, Cyclo-cross
3rd, Harderwijk, Cyclo-cross
3rd, Torino, Cyclo-cross
3rd, Niel, Cyclo-cross
3rd, Sankt-Wendel, Cyclo-cross
3rd, Hooglede, Cyclo-cross
3rd, Zeddam, Cyclo-cross
3rd, Loenhout, Cyclo-cross
2004–2005
1st, Genk, Cyclo-cross
1st, Harderwijk, Cyclo-cross
1st, Hooglede, Cyclo-cross
1st, Lebbeke, Cyclo-cross
2nd, Zolder, Cyclo-cross
2nd, Aalter, Cyclo-cross
2nd, Erpe-Mere, Cyclo-cross
2nd, Ardooie, Cyclo-cross
2nd, Vossem, Cyclo-cross
2nd, Gavere-Asper, Cyclo-cross
2nd, Milan, Cyclo-cross
2nd, Essen, Cyclo-cross
3rd, Ruddervoorde, Cyclo-cross
3rd, Koksijde, Cyclo-cross
3rd, Kalmthout, Cyclo-cross
3rd, National Cyclo-Cross Championship Wachtebeke
2006–2007
3rd, Muhlenbach, Cyclo-cross
2007–2008
2nd, Torhout-Wijnendale, Cyclo-cross
2nd, Lanarvily, Cyclo-cross
3rd, National Amateur Cyclo-Cross Championship, Hofstade

External links

1975 births
Living people
Belgian male cyclists
Cyclo-cross cyclists
Doping cases in cycling
Sportspeople from Hasselt
Cyclists from Limburg (Belgium)
20th-century Belgian people